Pavoraja nitida, commonly known as the peacock skate, is a species of fish in the family Arhynchobatidae. It lives near the soft bottoms of the continental shelf near the coasts of southeastern Australia in depths ranging from 30 to 390 metres. It produces oblong egg capsules which have stiff horns in each corner and lays them in sandy or muddy flats. Its maximum size is 36.8 cm.

References

 

Pavoraja
Marine fish of Southern Australia
Marine fish of Tasmania
Fish described in 1880
Taxa named by Albert Günther